Emma Hooper is a Canadian writer. She is most notable for her 2018 novel Our Homesick Songs, which was named as a longlisted nominee for the 2018 Scotiabank Giller Prize.
Born and raised in Alberta, she moved to England in 2004 after completing her B.A. in music and writing at the University of Alberta. She completed an M.A. in creative writing at Bath Spa University before undertaking a Ph.D. in creative and critical writing at the University of East Anglia, which she completed in 2010. She subsequently taught at Bath Spa University. Her debut novel, Etta and Otto and Russell and James, was published in 2015, and was a shortlisted finalist for the amazon.ca First Novel Award. Our Homesick Songs followed in 2018.

We Should Not Be Afraid of the Sky was longlisted for the inaugural Carol Shields Prize for Fiction in 2023.

Bibliography
Etta and Otto and Russell and James (2015)
Our Homesick Songs (2018)
We Should Not Be Afraid of the Sky (2022)

References

External links

Year of birth missing (living people)
Living people
University of Alberta alumni
Alumni of Bath Spa University
Alumni of the University of East Anglia
21st-century Canadian novelists
21st-century Canadian women writers
Canadian women novelists
Writers from Alberta